Calycopeplus is a plant genus of the family Euphorbiaceae first described by Jules Émile Planchon as a genus in 1861. The entire genus is endemic to Australia. Its closest relative is Neoguillauminia from New Caledonia.

The type species is Calycopeplus ephedroides, which is a synonym of Calycopeplus paucifolius.

Species
 Calycopeplus casuarinoides L.S.Sm. - N Qld
 Calycopeplus collinus P.I.Forst. - NT, N WA
 Calycopeplus marginatus Benth. - WA 
 Calycopeplus oligandrus P.I.Forst. - SW WA
 Calycopeplus paucifolius (Klotzsch) Baill. - SA, WA

Description 
The plants in this genus are monoecious, with the single sex flowers found in different parts of the same inflorescence. The female flowers are solitary and in the centre, while the male flowers are found in 4 clusters of 3–16 flowers within the involucre opposite the lobes. Each cluster is surrounded by bracts, with the outer one  or two being enlarged and enclosing the cluster.

References 

Euphorbiaceae genera
Euphorbieae
Endemic flora of Australia
Taxa named by Jules Émile Planchon
Plants described in 1861